Pregnanedione, or pregnane-3,20-dione, may refer to:

 5α-Dihydroprogesterone (5α-pregnane-3,20-dione)
 5β-Dihydroprogesterone (5β-pregnane-3,20-dione)

See also
 Progesterone (pregn-4-ene-3,20-dione)
 Pregnanolone
 Pregnanediol
 Pregnanetriol
 Pregna-4,20-dien-3,6-dione
 Hydroxyprogesterone

References

Pregnanes